Louisiana's 31st State Senate district is one of 39 districts in the Louisiana State Senate. It has been represented by Republican Louie Bernard since 2020, succeeding term-limited fellow Republican Gerald Long.

Geography
District 31 covers the Central Louisiana parishes of Red River and Sabine as well as parts of Grant, Natchitoches, Rapides, and Winn Parishes, including some or all of Alexandria, Natchitoches, Many, Winnfield, and Coushatta.

The district is split between Louisiana's 4th and 5th congressional districts, and overlaps with the 7th, 13th, 22nd, 23rd, 24th, 25th, 26th, and 27th districts of the Louisiana House of Representatives.

Recent election results
Louisiana uses a jungle primary system. If no candidate receives 50% in the first round of voting, when all candidates appear on the same ballot regardless of party, the top-two finishers advance to a runoff election.

2019

2015

2011

Federal and statewide results in District 31

References

Louisiana State Senate districts
Grant Parish, Louisiana
Natchitoches Parish, Louisiana
Rapides Parish, Louisiana
Red River Parish, Louisiana
Sabine Parish, Louisiana
Winn Parish, Louisiana